The 2010 Asian Youth Girls Volleyball Championship was held in Cheras Badminton Stadium, Kuala Lumpur, Malaysia from 20 to 28 May 2010.

Pools composition
The teams are seeded based on their final ranking at the 2008 Asian Youth Girls Volleyball Championship.

Preliminary round

Pool A

|}

|}

Pool B

|}

|}

Pool C

|}

|}

Pool D

|}

|}

Classification round
 The results and the points of the matches between the same teams that were already played during the preliminary round shall be taken into account for the classification round.

Pool E

|}

|}

Pool F

|}

|}

Pool G

|}

|}

Pool H

|}

|}

Classification 9th–12th

Semifinals

|}

11th place

|}

9th place

|}

Final round

Quarterfinals

|}

5th–8th semifinals

|}

Semifinals

|}

7th place

|}

5th place

|}

3rd place

|}

Final

|}

Final standing

Team Roster
Fumika Moriya, Mari Horikawa, Saori Kaneko, Azusa Futami, Kaho Ano, Mirei Sasaki, Yukiko Yanagidani, Yumiko Mochimaru, Sumiko Mori, Riho Otake, Aya Yamakami, Mika Yamada
Head Coach: Yoshiki Ogawa

Awards
MVP:  Mari Horikawa
Best Scorer:  Park Jeong-ah
Best Spiker:  Fumika Moriya
Best Blocker:  Liu Yanhan
Best Server:  Liu Mingjuan
Best Setter:  Yukiko Yanagidani
Best Libero:  Sumiko Mori

References
 www.asianvolleyball.org

External links
FIVB

A
V
V
Asian women's volleyball championships